The Luzha, a river in Kaluga Oblast in Russia,  originates in Moscow Oblast. It is a right tributary of the Protva (in the Oka river basin). The Luzha freezes up in November (rarely in December) and breaks up in April. The town of Maloyaroslavets, the site of an important battle in 1812 during the French invasion of Russia, is located on the Luzha.

References 

Rivers of Kaluga Oblast